Jornada Lakes is a group of small ephemeral lakes in the upper part of the Jornada Draw in the Jornada Del Muerto basin in Sierra County, New Mexico. They are crossed by Upham Road between Aleman and Engle.

References 

Jornada del Muerto
Bodies of water of Sierra County, New Mexico
Lakes of New Mexico